The 2005–06 St. Louis Blues season was the 39th for the franchise in St. Louis, Missouri, and the first since the 2004–05 NHL lockout. The Blues finished the regular season with a record of 21 wins, 46 losses and 15 losses in overtime, sufficient for an NHL season-low of 57 points. The Blues failed to qualify for the Stanley Cup playoffs for the first time since the 1978–79 season, ending their streak of consecutive playoff appearances at 25 seasons.

Offseason
Dallas Drake was named team captain, following the retirement of previous captain Al MacInnis.

Regular season
The Blues finished 30th overall in scoring, with just 192 goals for (excluding shootout-winning goals).

Final standings

Schedule and results

|- align="center" bgcolor="#FFBBBB"
|1||L||October 5, 2005||1–5 || align="left"| @ Detroit Red Wings (2005–06) ||0–1–0 || 
|- align="center" bgcolor="#FFBBBB"
|2||L||October 6, 2005||3–4 || align="left"|  Detroit Red Wings (2005–06) ||0–2–0 || 
|- align="center" bgcolor="#FFBBBB"
|3||L||October 8, 2005||6–7 || align="left"|  San Jose Sharks (2005–06) ||0–3–0 || 
|- align="center" bgcolor="#BBFFBB"
|4||W||October 11, 2005||4–1 || align="left"|  Chicago Blackhawks (2005–06) ||1–3–0 || 
|- align="center" bgcolor="#FFBBBB"
|5||L||October 15, 2005||1–4 || align="left"|  Nashville Predators (2005–06) ||1–4–0 || 
|- align="center" bgcolor="#BBFFBB"
|6||W||October 19, 2005||3–2 || align="left"|  Mighty Ducks of Anaheim (2005–06) ||2–4–0 || 
|- align="center" 
|7||L||October 20, 2005||2–3 SO|| align="left"| @ Nashville Predators (2005–06) ||2–4–1 || 
|- align="center" bgcolor="#FFBBBB"
|8||L||October 22, 2005||2–3 || align="left"|  Minnesota Wild (2005–06) ||2–5–1 || 
|- align="center" 
|9||L||October 25, 2005||4–5 OT|| align="left"| @ Phoenix Coyotes (2005–06) ||2–5–2 || 
|- align="center" bgcolor="#FFBBBB"
|10||L||October 28, 2005||4–6 || align="left"| @ Mighty Ducks of Anaheim (2005–06) ||2–6–2 || 
|- align="center" bgcolor="#FFBBBB"
|11||L||October 29, 2005||2–5 || align="left"| @ Los Angeles Kings (2005–06) ||2–7–2 || 
|-

|- align="center" 
|12||L||November 2, 2005||5–6 OT|| align="left"|  Chicago Blackhawks (2005–06) ||2–7–3 || 
|- align="center" bgcolor="#FFBBBB"
|13||L||November 4, 2005||2–7 || align="left"|  Edmonton Oilers (2005–06) ||2–8–3 || 
|- align="center" bgcolor="#FFBBBB"
|14||L||November 6, 2005||1–4 || align="left"|  Detroit Red Wings (2005–06) ||2–9–3 || 
|- align="center" bgcolor="#FFBBBB"
|15||L||November 9, 2005||1–3 || align="left"| @ Columbus Blue Jackets (2005–06) ||2–10–3 || 
|- align="center" bgcolor="#FFBBBB"
|16||L||November 10, 2005||2–4 || align="left"|  Chicago Blackhawks (2005–06) ||2–11–3 || 
|- align="center" bgcolor="#FFBBBB"
|17||L||November 12, 2005||1–3 || align="left"| @ Nashville Predators (2005–06) ||2–12–3 || 
|- align="center" bgcolor="#BBFFBB"
|18||W||November 16, 2005||2–0 || align="left"| @ Columbus Blue Jackets (2005–06) ||3–12–3 || 
|- align="center" bgcolor="#BBFFBB"
|19||W||November 19, 2005||3–2 || align="left"| @ Detroit Red Wings (2005–06) ||4–12–3 || 
|- align="center" bgcolor="#FFBBBB"
|20||L||November 22, 2005||3–6 || align="left"|  Los Angeles Kings (2005–06) ||4–13–3 || 
|- align="center" bgcolor="#FFBBBB"
|21||L||November 25, 2005||3–5 || align="left"| @ Minnesota Wild (2005–06) ||4–14–3 || 
|- align="center" bgcolor="#FFBBBB"
|22||L||November 26, 2005||3–4 || align="left"|  Columbus Blue Jackets (2005–06) ||4–15–3 || 
|-

|- align="center" bgcolor="#BBFFBB"
|23||W||December 1, 2005||4–1 || align="left"|  Columbus Blue Jackets (2005–06) ||5–15–3 || 
|- align="center" bgcolor="#FFBBBB"
|24||L||December 6, 2005||3–6 || align="left"|  New York Islanders (2005–06) ||5–16–3 || 
|- align="center" bgcolor="#FFBBBB"
|25||L||December 8, 2005||4–5 || align="left"| @ Tampa Bay Lightning (2005–06) ||5–17–3 || 
|- align="center" 
|26||L||December 10, 2005||4–5 OT|| align="left"|  New York Rangers (2005–06) ||5–17–4 || 
|- align="center" bgcolor="#BBFFBB"
|27||W||December 13, 2005||3–0 || align="left"|  Pittsburgh Penguins (2005–06) ||6–17–4 || 
|- align="center" bgcolor="#FFBBBB"
|28||L||December 16, 2005||1–5 || align="left"| @ Chicago Blackhawks (2005–06) ||6–18–4 || 
|- align="center" bgcolor="#FFBBBB"
|29||L||December 17, 2005||2–5 || align="left"|  Philadelphia Flyers (2005–06) ||6–19–4 || 
|- align="center" bgcolor="#BBFFBB"
|30||W||December 20, 2005||5–4 || align="left"| @ Phoenix Coyotes (2005–06) ||7–19–4 || 
|- align="center" bgcolor="#FFBBBB"
|31||L||December 21, 2005||3–6 || align="left"| @ Mighty Ducks of Anaheim (2005–06) ||7–20–4 || 
|- align="center" bgcolor="#BBFFBB" 
|32||W||December 23, 2005||2–1 SO|| align="left"| @ San Jose Sharks (2005–06) ||8–20–4 || 
|- align="center" bgcolor="#FFBBBB"
|33||L||December 26, 2005||1–6 || align="left"|  Dallas Stars (2005–06) ||8–21–4 || 
|- align="center" bgcolor="#BBFFBB"
|34||W||December 28, 2005||2–1 || align="left"| @ Chicago Blackhawks (2005–06) ||9–21–4 || 
|- align="center" bgcolor="#FFBBBB"
|35||L||December 29, 2005||0–3 || align="left"| @ Dallas Stars (2005–06) ||9–22–4 || 
|- align="center" 
|36||L||December 31, 2005||4–5 SO|| align="left"|  Mighty Ducks of Anaheim (2005–06) ||9–22–5 || 
|-

|- align="center" bgcolor="#BBFFBB"
|37||W||January 2, 2006||4–1 || align="left"|  Vancouver Canucks (2005–06) ||10–22–5 || 
|- align="center" bgcolor="#FFBBBB"
|38||L||January 4, 2006||3–4 || align="left"|  Nashville Predators (2005–06) ||10–23–5 || 
|- align="center" bgcolor="#FFBBBB"
|39||L||January 5, 2006||0–3 || align="left"| @ Detroit Red Wings (2005–06) ||10–24–5 || 
|- align="center" bgcolor="#FFBBBB"
|40||L||January 9, 2006||1–6 || align="left"| @ Colorado Avalanche (2005–06) ||10–25–5 || 
|- align="center" bgcolor="#FFBBBB"
|41||L||January 12, 2006||1–3 || align="left"| @ Florida Panthers (2005–06) ||10–26–5 || 
|- align="center" bgcolor="#FFBBBB"
|42||L||January 13, 2006||0–2 || align="left"| @ Atlanta Thrashers (2005–06) ||10–27–5 || 
|- align="center" bgcolor="#FFBBBB"
|43||L||January 15, 2006||2–4 || align="left"| @ Carolina Hurricanes (2005–06) ||10–28–5 || 
|- align="center" bgcolor="#FFBBBB"
|44||L||January 17, 2006||3–5 || align="left"|  New Jersey Devils (2005–06) ||10–29–5 || 
|- align="center" 
|45||L||January 19, 2006||4–5 SO|| align="left"| @ Washington Capitals (2005–06) ||10–29–6 || 
|- align="center" 
|46||L||January 20, 2006||3–4 SO|| align="left"| @ Columbus Blue Jackets (2005–06) ||10–29–7 || 
|- align="center" bgcolor="#BBFFBB"
|47||W||January 23, 2006||4–0 || align="left"|  Vancouver Canucks (2005–06) ||11–29–7 || 
|- align="center" 
|48||L||January 25, 2006||3–4 SO|| align="left"| @ Dallas Stars (2005–06) ||11–29–8 || 
|- align="center" bgcolor="#FFBBBB"
|49||L||January 26, 2006||3–5 || align="left"|  Phoenix Coyotes (2005–06) ||11–30–8 || 
|- align="center" bgcolor="#BBFFBB"
|50||W||January 30, 2006||3–2 SO|| align="left"|  Calgary Flames (2005–06) ||12–30–8 || 
|-

|- align="center" bgcolor="#FFBBBB"
|51||L||February 1, 2006||2–3 || align="left"| @ Detroit Red Wings (2005–06) ||12–31–8 || 
|- align="center" bgcolor="#BBFFBB"
|52||W||February 2, 2006||6–5 SO|| align="left"|  Chicago Blackhawks (2005–06) ||13–31–8 || 
|- align="center" bgcolor="#BBFFBB"
|53||W||February 4, 2006||4–3 OT|| align="left"|  Dallas Stars (2005–06) ||14–31–8 || 
|- align="center" bgcolor="#BBFFBB"
|54||W||February 8, 2006||4–2 || align="left"| @ Vancouver Canucks (2005–06) ||15–31–8 || 
|- align="center" 
|55||L||February 10, 2006||2–3 OT|| align="left"| @ Calgary Flames (2005–06) ||15–31–9 || 
|- align="center" bgcolor="#BBFFBB"
|56||W||February 12, 2006||5–4 SO|| align="left"| @ Edmonton Oilers (2005–06) ||16–31–9 || 
|-

|- align="center" bgcolor="#BBFFBB"
|57||W||March 1, 2006||4–2 || align="left"| @ Edmonton Oilers (2005–06) ||17–31–9 || 
|- align="center" bgcolor="#FFBBBB"
|58||L||March 2, 2006||1–3 || align="left"| @ Calgary Flames (2005–06) ||17–32–9 || 
|- align="center" bgcolor="#BBFFBB"
|59||W||March 5, 2006||4–1 || align="left"| @ Vancouver Canucks (2005–06) ||18–32–9 || 
|- align="center" 
|60||L||March 7, 2006||1–2 SO|| align="left"|  Colorado Avalanche (2005–06) ||18–32–10 || 
|- align="center" bgcolor="#BBFFBB"
|61||W||March 10, 2006||2–1 OT|| align="left"|  Minnesota Wild (2005–06) ||19–32–10 || 
|- align="center" 
|62||L||March 11, 2006||1–2 SO|| align="left"|  Los Angeles Kings (2005–06) ||19–32–11 || 
|- align="center" bgcolor="#BBFFBB"
|63||W||March 13, 2006||3–2 OT|| align="left"|  Columbus Blue Jackets (2005–06) ||20–32–11 || 
|- align="center" bgcolor="#FFBBBB"
|64||L||March 16, 2006||2–5 || align="left"| @ San Jose Sharks (2005–06) ||20–33–11 || 
|- align="center" bgcolor="#FFBBBB"
|65||L||March 18, 2006||1–3 || align="left"| @ Los Angeles Kings (2005–06) ||20–34–11 || 
|- align="center" bgcolor="#FFBBBB"
|66||L||March 20, 2006||2–4 || align="left"| @ Nashville Predators (2005–06) ||20–35–11 || 
|- align="center" bgcolor="#FFBBBB"
|67||L||March 21, 2006||0–6 || align="left"|  San Jose Sharks (2005–06) ||20–36–11 || 
|- align="center" bgcolor="#FFBBBB"
|68||L||March 23, 2006||2–7 || align="left"|  Calgary Flames (2005–06) ||20–37–11 || 
|- align="center" 
|69||L||March 25, 2006||2–3 OT|| align="left"|  Colorado Avalanche (2005–06) ||20–37–12 || 
|- align="center" bgcolor="#FFBBBB"
|70||L||March 27, 2006||1–4 || align="left"|  Detroit Red Wings (2005–06) ||20–38–12 || 
|- align="center" 
|71||L||March 29, 2006||2–3 OT|| align="left"| @ Chicago Blackhawks (2005–06) ||20–38–13 || 
|- align="center" bgcolor="#FFBBBB"
|72||L||March 31, 2006||2–4 || align="left"|  Columbus Blue Jackets (2005–06) ||20–39–13 || 
|-

|- align="center" bgcolor="#FFBBBB"
|73||L||April 1, 2006||1–2 || align="left"| @ Nashville Predators (2005–06) ||20–40–13 || 
|- align="center" 
|74||L||April 4, 2006||4–5 SO|| align="left"| @ Minnesota Wild (2005–06) ||20–40–14 || 
|- align="center" bgcolor="#FFBBBB"
|75||L||April 6, 2006||0–3 || align="left"|  Nashville Predators (2005–06) ||20–41–14 || 
|- align="center" bgcolor="#FFBBBB"
|76||L||April 8, 2006||2–4 || align="left"| @ Colorado Avalanche (2005–06) ||20–42–14 || 
|- align="center" bgcolor="#BBFFBB"
|77||W||April 9, 2006||2–1 || align="left"|  Edmonton Oilers (2005–06) ||21–42–14 || 
|- align="center" bgcolor="#FFBBBB"
|78||L||April 11, 2006||0–2 || align="left"|  Nashville Predators (2005–06) ||21–43–14 || 
|- align="center" bgcolor="#FFBBBB"
|79||L||April 13, 2006||1–4 || align="left"| @ Columbus Blue Jackets (2005–06) ||21–44–14 || 
|- align="center" bgcolor="#FFBBBB"
|80||L||April 15, 2006||2–3 || align="left"|  Detroit Red Wings (2005–06) ||21–45–14 || 
|- align="center" bgcolor="#FFBBBB"
|81||L||April 16, 2006||0–3 || align="left"|  Phoenix Coyotes (2005–06) ||21–46–14 || 
|- align="center" 
|82||L||April 18, 2006||2–3 OT|| align="left"| @ Chicago Blackhawks (2005–06) ||21–46–15 || 
|-

|-
| Legend:

Player statistics

Scoring
 Position abbreviations: C = Center; D = Defense; G = Goaltender; LW = Left Wing; RW = Right Wing
  = Joined team via a transaction (e.g., trade, waivers, signing) during the season. Stats reflect time with the Blues only.
  = Left team via a transaction (e.g., trade, waivers, release) during the season. Stats reflect time with the Blues only.

Goaltending

Awards and records

Awards

Transactions
The Blues were involved in the following transactions from February 17, 2005, the day after the 2004–05 NHL season was officially cancelled, through June 19, 2006, the day of the deciding game of the 2006 Stanley Cup Finals.

Trades

Players acquired

Players lost

Signings

Draft picks
St. Louis's draft picks at the 2005 NHL Entry Draft held at the Westin Hotel in Ottawa, Ontario.

Farm teams
Peoria Rivermen (AHL) - Peoria, Illinois Posted 46-26-0-8 Record, lost in 2nd round of playoffs
Alaska Aces (ECHL) - Anchorage, Alaska Posted 53-12-0-7 Record, won Kelly Cup

See also
2005–06 NHL season

Notes

References

St. Louis
St. Louis
St. Louis Blues seasons
St Louis
St Louis